The Sierra Nevada Conservancy is the largest conservancy in the U.S. state of California, 
and the largest state conservation effort of its kind in the nation.

The nonregulatory, nonprofit organization functions under the State Resources Agency.  The conservancy creates grants for economic, recreation, and resource preservation in the greater Sierra Nevada area. In addition, it offers educational symposiums.

Since 1973, seven other state conservancies were formed in California.  The Sierra Nevada Conservancy was established with the passing of Assembly Bill 2600 in 2004, and is supported by the Sierra Nevada Alliance. Its creation was spearheaded by Governor Arnold Schwarzenegger, and co-sponsored by Assemblymembers Tim Leslie and John Laird. In 2006, voters passed Proposition 84, with some of the funding appropriated to the Sierra Nevada Conservancy for safe water supply and quality, flood control, park improvements and natural resource protection.

Including 3500 plant species, and 720 animal species, it supports half of California's plants, half of the state's reptile and amphibian species, and two-thirds of the state's bird and mammal species.

The conservancy has offices in Auburn, Bishop, Mariposa, and Susanville. It is governed by a 13-member board, and there are three non-voting members. In November 2005, Jim Branham was appointed as the organisation's first Executive Officer.

References

Sierra Nevada (United States)
California Natural Resources Agency
Nature conservation organizations based in the United States
Ecology of the Sierra Nevada (United States)
Environmental organizations based in California
Environment of California
Land management in the United States
State agencies of California
Environmental organizations established in 2004
Government agencies established in 2004
2004 establishments in California
Government of Alpine County, California
Government of Amador County, California
Government of Butte County, California
Government of Calaveras County, California
Government of El Dorado County, California
Government of Fresno County, California
Government of Inyo County, California
Government of Kern County, California
Government of Lassen County, California
Government of Madera County, California
Government of Mariposa County, California
Government of Modoc County, California
Government of Mono County, California
Government of Nevada County, California
Government of Placer County, California
Government of Plumas County, California
Government of Shasta County, California
Government of Sierra County, California
Government of Tehama County, California
Government of Tulare County, California
Government of Tuolumne County, California
Government of Yuba County, California